The 9th TCA Awards were presented by the Television Critics Association. The ceremony was held on July 23, 1993, at the Universal City Hilton and Towers in Los Angeles, Calif.

Winners and nominees

Multiple nominations 
The following shows received multiple nominations:

References

External links
Official website
1993 TCA Awards at IMDb.com

1993 television awards
1993 in American television
TCA Awards ceremonies